The 1985–86 League of Ireland Premier Division was the first season of the League of Ireland Premier Division. The Premier Division was made up of 12 teams.

Overview
The Premier Division was contested by 12 teams and Shamrock Rovers F.C. won the championship. The top 12 teams from the 1984–85 League of Ireland automatically qualified for the Premier Division.

Teams

Stadia and locations

Final Table

Results

League of Ireland clubs in Europe

European Cup

First round
After winning the league title in the previous season, Shamrock Rovers received automatic qualification into the first round of the European Cup. Shamrock Rovers were drawn against Hungarian club, Budapest Honvéd, 1984-85 Hungarian League Winners. Budapest Honvéd were the hosts for the first leg and won the game comfortably in a 2-0 defeat to Shamrock Rovers. In the return leg, Shamrock Rovers were defeated once again 3-1, thus eliminating them from the competition.

First leg

Second leg

Budapest Honvéd won 5–1 on aggregate.

UEFA Cup

First round

European Cup Winners Cup

First round
FAI Cup Runners-up, Galway United entered the European Cup Winners' Cup in the first round against Danish side, Lyngby BK. Galway United were defeated 1-0 in the away leg in Lyngby BK. In the second leg, United were defeated 3-2 at Terryland Park, ending their European campaign.

See also
 1985–86 League of Ireland First Division

References

League of Ireland Premier Division seasons
Ireland, 1985-86
1